The National Action (more commonly known by its Afrikaans name, Nasionale Aksie) was a short-lived South African political party formed by Cassie Aucamp when he left the Afrikaner Eenheidsbeweging (AEB) in the 2003 floor-crossing window. The AEB, along with other Afrikaner parties, was merging into the Freedom Front Plus to contest the 2004 elections but the National Action, claiming to support Afrikaner interests, remained separate, and competed in the 2004 elections. It won no seats in the National Assembly of South Africa or any of the provincial legislatures. It did not contest the 2009 elections.

Election results

References

2003 establishments in South Africa
Afrikaner nationalism
Afrikaner organizations
Boer nationalism
Defunct political parties in South Africa
Nationalist parties in South Africa
Political parties established in 2003
Political parties of minorities
Political parties with year of disestablishment missing
Separatism in South Africa
White nationalist parties